The New Haven Ninjas were an indoor American football team based in New Haven, Connecticut. They were an expansion team in the af2 for the 2002 season. On October 24, 2001, it was announced that Ninjas had won the name-the-team contest over Cyclones, Gladiators, Hawkeyes and ShoreDawgs. Along with the Ninjas, New Haven was joined by the Albany Conquest, Bakersfield Blitz, Cape Fear Wildcats, Fresno Frenzy, Hawaiian Islanders, Mobile Wizards, Mohegan Wolves, San Diego Riptide & the Wilkes-Barre/Scranton Pioneers. New Haven played in the American Conference of the Northeast Division. In 2002, the Ninjas finished 6–10, third in the Northeast Division.  Still, that wasn't enough to play football in August. After the 2002 season, the Ninjas folded because the New Haven Coliseum closed, and the experiment for arena football in New Haven was done.

Roster

Season-By-Season

|-
|2002 || 6 || 10 || 0 || 4th AC Northeast || --
|}

References

External links
 New Haven Ninjas on ArenaFan.com

American football teams in Connecticut
Ninjas
Defunct af2 teams
American football teams established in 2001
American football teams disestablished in 2002
2001 establishments in Connecticut
2002 disestablishments in Connecticut